Chorsu may refer to:

Chorsu Bazaar, a market in Tashkent, Uzbekistan
Chorsu (Tashkent Metro), a metro station in Tashkent, Uzbekistan
Chorsu (Samarkand), a building in Samarkand, Uzbekistan
Chorsu, Vahdat, a jamoat of the city of Vahdat, Tajikistan
Chorsu, Lakhsh District, a village in Lakhsh District, Tajikistan